Doc Watson in Nashville: Good Deal! is the title of a recording by American folk music artist Doc Watson, released in 1968.

With the folk music boom on the wane, Watson traveled to Nashville. The result is a more polished sound with members of The Nashville A-Team backing him up.

Reception

Writing for Allmusic, music critic Bruce Eder wrote the album "The playing is more impressive than the arrangements, which have that trademark Nashville smoothness..."

Track listing
 "Alabama Jubilee" (George Cobb, Jack Yellen) – 2:12
 "Streamline Cannonball" (Roy Acuff) – 2:28
 "Peach Pickin' Time in Georgia" (Jimmie Rodgers) – 2:59
 "June Apple" (Traditional) – 2:12
 "I'm Thinking of My Blue Eyes" (A. P. Carter) – 3:28
 "Memphis Blues" (W. C. Handy, George Norton) – 2:45
 "The Train That Carried My Girl from Town" (Traditional) – 3:47
 "Old Camp Meeting Time" (Traditional) – 2:50
 "Bye Bye Blues" (Dave Bennett, Chauncy Gray, Fred Hamm, Bert Lown) – 2:44
 "Shady Grove" (Traditional) – 2:59
 "Blackberry Rag" (Watson) – 2:40
 "The Girl in the Blue Velvet Band" (Cliff Carlisle, Mel Foree) – 3:24
 "Rainbow" (Traditional) – 2:34
 "Step It Up and Go" (Blind Boy Fuller) – 1:55

Personnel
Doc Watson – 6 & 12 string guitars, banjo, vocals
Merle Watson – guitar
Junior Huskey – bass
Floyd Cramer – piano
Buddy Harman – drums
Shot Jackson – dobro
Grady Martin – guitar, Spanish dobro
Buddy Spicher – fiddle
Tommy Jackson - fiddle
Don Stover – banjo
Production notes
Jack Lothrop – producer
Jules Halfant – art direction
Joel Brodsky – photography

References

1968 albums
Doc Watson albums
Vanguard Records albums
Albums with cover art by Joel Brodsky